Margaret Wootten Collier (Wootten; pen name, Mrs. Bryan Wells Collier; December 9, 1869 – January 6, 1947) was an American writer of the Southern Renaissance era. She was the author of the seven volume Representative Women of the South, 1861-1925 (1920, 1923, 1925), and was the official biographer of the Confederate Southern Memorial Association.

Early life and education
Margaret Marion Wootten was born in Walker County, Georgia, December 9, 1869. She was the youngest daughter of John Fletcher Wootten, M. D., of Wilkes County, Georgia, and Margaret Marion (Hendrix) Wootten. Collier was one of four sisters, three of whom married ministers.

Collier graduated from Dalton Female Academy and LaGrange Female College. She did special study of music under Professor Henry Schoeller and Alfredo Barili.

Career

Collier was the author of the poem, "In My Garden of Love" (1925). She also edited the multi-volume Representative Women of the South, 1861-1920, 1920; Representative Women of the South, 1861-1923, 1923; and Representative Women of the South, 1861-1925, 1925. Every State where there was a Chapter of the two Southern organizations -Memorial Association and Daughters of the Confederacy- was represented in this compilation. Included were pictures and sketches of Children of the Confederacy.

She was a member of the National League of American Pen Women and of the National Society Daughters of the American Colonists; historian of the Atlanta Chapter of the Daughters of the American Revolution (D.A.R.; 1923–25); Corresponding Secretary General of Confederated Memorial Association (beginning in 1917); and president of the Robert Lee Chapter, United Daughters of the Confederacy (College Park, Georgia).

Personal life
On December 9, 1897, she married the Rev. Bryan Wells Collier (1868-1937) of Griffin, Georgia. Their children were Bryan Wootten (born 1899) and Thomas Wootten (born 1902).

Margaret Wootten Collier died in Atlanta, Georgia, January 6, 1947, and was buried in Dalton.

Selected works
 Biographies of representative women of the South

See also
 Southern United States literature

References

1869 births
1947 deaths
20th-century American biographers
20th-century American women writers
Daughters of the American Revolution people
Members of the United Daughters of the Confederacy
People from Walker County, Georgia
Writers from Georgia (U.S. state)
Southern United States literature